Markku Pauli Hakulinen (27 February 1956 – 9 October 1990) was a Finnish ice hockey player. He competed in the men's tournament at the 1980 Winter Olympics. Hakulinen committed suicide by jumping in front of a train in 1990.

References

External links
 

1956 births
1990 suicides
Finnish ice hockey right wingers
HPK players
KOOVEE players
Lahti Pelicans players
TuTo players
Olympic ice hockey players of Finland
Ice hockey players at the 1980 Winter Olympics
People from Joensuu
Suicides by train
Suicides in Finland
Sportspeople from North Karelia